Global sat Group is a consortium of companies providing satellite communication services worldwide with headquarters located in the United States.

History 
Globalsat Group was founded by J. Alberto Palacios in 1999. Palacios is also the active Executive Chairman of this multi-company entity.

Awards, memberships and recognition 
 2018 Top Land Mobility Sat com Innovation Award by the Mobile Satellite Users Association at Satellite 2018 
 2017 Latin America Satellite Communications Company of the Year by Frost and Sullivan
 2016 MSUA Company to Watch in the category Emergency Response Mobility Satcom Innovation 
 2016 Latin America Satellite Communications Company of the Year by Frost and Sullivan 
 Member of the Mobile Satellite Users Association (MSUA) 
 Member of the Space & Satellite Professionals International (SSPI) 
 Inmarsat Enterprise T 1 Distribution Partner 
 Iridium VAR, PTT Service Provider, Certs Service Provider, Authorized Repair Center 
 Cobham Certified Partner 
 Thales LINK Satellite Certified Reseller

Satellite services 
Most products and services provided by the consortium are in the field of satellite-based communications including voice, Internet, and Machine-to-Machine (M2M) with emphasis on L band mobile satellite service (MSS) through the Iridium and Inmarsat satellite constellations. Fixed-satellite service (FSS) / VSAT and system integration are also provided in some markets, as well as Inmarsat's Ka band mobile service known as Global Express (GX). One of the group's largest projects as of 2022 involves a utility company in Brazil which uses mixed L-band and terrestrial cellular for redundant high availability mobile push-to-talk communications.

Recent activities

In March 2018, Global sat Group was awarded for the work of its Brazilian affiliate Globalsat do Brasil on a solution which uses L-band Mss to provide dependable communications to a railway system.

In 2017 Inmarsat highlighted the railway project in Brazil as one of its important success stories.

In March 2016, Global sat Group was named "Company to Watch" in the category Emergency Response Mobility Satcom Innovation by the Mobile Satellite Users Association (MSUA) at the Satellite 2016 conference, for its role as a provider of satellite services for the tsunami detection and warning system operated by Chile's government, through the local subsidiary Global sat Chile.

In May 2016 the group received the "2016 Latin America Satellite Communications Company of the Year" award from the highly recognized international consulting firm Frost & Sullivan.

In November 2016 LeoSat and Global sat Group sign a strategic worldwide agreement. Leo Sat Enterprises is planning to launch a constellation of as many as 108 LEO communications satellites. Under the agreement, Global sat Group will provide market access and Leo Sat will provide infrastructure for service. J. Alberto Palacios, CEO of Global sat, will hold a seat in the representation of the group on the Leo Sat Customer Technical Advisory Committee (CT AC). The committee will advise on system configuration, product design and launch of Leo Sat's upcoming satellite constellation.

In December 2016 Global sat Group obtained a license for all Inmarsat services through its Mexican affiliate Multi SAT. This includes official authorization and landing rights for foreign satellite signals in the Ka and L bands.

In March 2017 Global sat Group has been appointed as a Tier 1 Enterprise Distribution Partner to Inmarsat Global, the global mobile satellite operator. This improved situation will enable Global sat Group to have access to Inmarsat upcoming products, direct hotlines to operations personnel for faster customer support and a higher level of solutions customization.

In March 2017 Global sat Group and Sky and Space Global signed an MoU towards testing and offering satellite service in Latin America. Under the agreement, the group will take part in early trials of the Sky and Space Global satellite system. The non-binding deal also involves working towards establishing a commercial agreement for providing services to end-users across Global sat Groups' multi-country footprint.

In January 2018, Global sat Group bought major shares in Peruvian connectivity provider ST 2. Sky and Space Global has joined hands with Globalsat Group for the launch of nano-satellites to revolutionize the telecommunication.

In August 2022 Globalstar and Globalsat announced a joint IoT solution for monitoring renewable energy stations in Latin America.

Subsidiaries

The companies that are currently part of the consortium include:

 Globalsat Group LLC
 Globalsat Bolivia
 Globalsat Argentina
 Globalsat do Brasil 
 Globalsat Ecuador
 Globalsat Chile 
 Globalsat Colombia 
 Globalsat Peru 
 Multisat Mexico 
 Intersatellite do Brasil
 ST2 Peru 
 N-SAT Puerto Rico

See also 
 Inmarsat
 Intelsat
 Intersputnik
 Iridium Communications
 O3b Networks
 OneWeb
 Orbcomm
 SES Broadband for Maritime
 Sky and Space Global
 Thuraya

References

External links

Satellite Internet access
Satellite telephony
Telecommunications companies of the United States
Companies based in Florida